The International Journal of Chronic Obstructive Pulmonary Disease is a peer-reviewed medical journal focusing on chronic obstructive pulmonary disease. It was established in 2006; from 2009 it has been available only online. It is published by Dove Medical Press.

It is indexed in the Science Citation Index, and the full text of articles are available at PubMed Central.

References

External links 
 

English-language journals
Open access journals
Dove Medical Press academic journals
Pulmonology journals
Publications established in 2006